Lisa Diane Whelchel (born May 29, 1963) is an American actress, singer, songwriter, author, and life coach. She is known for her appearances as a Mouseketeer on The New Mickey Mouse Club and her nine-year role as the preppy and wealthy Blair Warner on The Facts of Life. In 1984, she was nominated for a Grammy Award for Best Inspirational Performance for her contemporary Christian album All Because of You. In 2012, Whelchel participated as a contestant on the CBS competitive reality series Survivor: Philippines and tied for second place. She was also voted fan favorite and was awarded $100,000.

Early life 

Lisa Whelchel was born on May 29, 1963, in Littlefield, Texas. She is the daughter of Virginia "Genny" (née French), a real estate agent, and James "Jimmy" Whelchel Sr., an electrician. Her parents divorced in 1981, and her mother married Roy Coleman in 1983. Lisa is the elder sister of James "Cody" Whelchel Jr., and the elder half-sister of Casey Justice Coleman. She also has a nephew, Chasin (Cody's son). Lisa and Cody were raised for most of their childhood in Fort Worth, Texas, and she was in the class of 1980.

Acting career

The New Mickey Mouse Club
At age 12, Whelchel was recruited in Texas by talent scouts who were looking for children interested in working with Disney Studios as a Mouseketeer on The New Mickey Mouse Club. She moved to California the next year and appeared on the show in syndication from 1977 to 1978.

The Facts of Life
Whelchel was probably best known for being a main cast member of The Facts of Life where she portrayed Blair Warner, an uptight prep student. She also played the character on Diff'rent Strokes, the show from which The Facts of Life spun off. Whelchel once refused a storyline that would have made her character the first among the four main young women on the show to lose her virginity. Having become a Christian when she was ten years old, Whelchel refused because of her Christian convictions, and the storyline was rewritten for the character of Natalie, portrayed by Mindy Cohn. This was the only episode of the series in which Whelchel did not appear.

In 2001, Whelchel reprised her role as Blair Warner for the made-for-television movie, The Facts of Life Reunion.

On March 7, 2004, Whelchel was reunited with Charlotte Rae to perform The Facts of Life theme song at the 2nd Annual TV Land Awards at the Hollywood Palladium in Hollywood. In spring 2006, she appeared with two of her Facts of Life co-stars on The Today Show to promote the show's DVD releases of the first and second seasons, admitting to being "really bummed out" that Kim Fields was unable to attend. On February 1, 2007, Whelchel was reunited with Kim Fields on WFAA-TV's Good Morning Texas. Fields was in Dallas to promote her appearance in the production Issues:  We've All Got 'Em, when Whelchel was introduced as a surprise guest. On April 10, 2011, Whelchel and the cast of The Facts of Life, including Charlotte Rae, Nancy McKeon, Mindy Cohn, Kim Fields, Geri Jewell, and Cloris Leachman were honored with the Pop Culture Award at the 9th Annual TV Land Awards at the Javits Center in New York City.

In 2021, Whelchel, Fields, and Cohn reunited again on the set of Live in Front of a Studio Audience'''s reenactment of the show's third season episode "Kids Can Be Cruel". Whelchel also sang the show's theme song that evening.

 Music career 
In 1984, Whelchel released a Christian pop album entitled All Because of You. The album reached No. 17 on the Billboard Contemporary Christian music charts. She was nominated for a Grammy Award for Best Inspirational Performance and was recognized as the writer of the title song, "All Because of You". Among the songs featured on the album were "All Because of You", "Just Obey", "Cover Me Lord", and "Good Girl". She did not record a second album. While she was appearing on The Facts of Life, she made a cameo appearance in the music video for contemporary Christian music singer-songwriter Steve Taylor's song "Meltdown (at Madame Tussaud's)". The song was the title track from the album Meltdown.

 Speaking 
For years, Whelchel was a regular inspirational speaker at churches and conferences nationwide. In 2000, she founded Momtime Ministries, a religious network of mothers' groups who met weekly to "equip and refresh and encourage" each other.

In 2021, Whelchel appeared on friend and The Facts of Life co-star Mindy Cohn’s podcast, Mondays with Mindy, on which she talked about how her faith has changed and evolved over time. As a result, she explained that she does not usually speak at faith-based ministries, because she no longer operates 
from a "fear-based, punishment-based" mentality. She explained, "Jesus came, ultimately, to bring grace. I can speak that message in any situation, but a lot of churches — when they find out that I believe that there are many ways to experience God, not just Jesus, then the invitations kind of dry up." 

 Writing 
Whelchel has written ten books on motherhood, child discipline, adult friendships, homeschooling, and finding Jesus through the development of holiday traditions. Additional topics from a spiritual point of view include prayer and wisdom. She is the bestselling author of So You're Thinking About Homeschooling and The Facts of Life (and Other Lessons My Father Taught Me).

Lisa Whelchel has been honored as a Gold Medallion nominee for her book on child discipline, entitled Creative Correction.Survivor
On August 20, 2012, Whelchel was announced as a contestant in Survivor: Philippines as a member of the Tandang tribe. She joined retired Major League Baseball star Jeff Kent as one of the season's two "celebrity" contestants. A former television star, she elected to keep her true identity a secret from the other contestants, many of whom were too young to have watched The Facts of Life during its original run and thus did not recognize her. Michael Skupin and Jonathan Penner, who were around Whelchel's age, as well as eventual winner Denise Stapley, were the only ones to recognize her as "Blair Warner".

On November 14, 2012, Whelchel announced via her Twitter account that she was suffering from West Nile fever and had been advised by her doctor that recovery would take approximately one year. She did not specify whether she had contracted the arbovirus while in the Philippines shooting Survivor.

On December 16, 2012, Whelchel made it to the Final Tribal Council, where fellow contestant and jury member Jonathan Penner revealed to the rest of the jury that she was a former child star. In the end, she received one jury vote from RC Saint-Amour and tied with returning contestant Michael Skupin for runner-up, both losing to eventual winner Denise Stapley. She was also voted the Sprint Player of the Season, winning $100,000 by a margin of about .7 percent against Malcolm Freberg.

Hosting duties
On January 14, 2013, Whelchel co-hosted several episodes of The Jeff Probst Show with Survivor host, Jeff Probst.

In January 2019, Whelchel promoted The Facts of Life marathon on the MeTV television network, where she had hosted Collector's Call since April 7, 2019.

Personal life
On July 9, 1988, Whelchel married Steven Cauble, who was an associate pastor at The Church on the Way in Van Nuys, California, which Whelchel attended at the time. The couple, who have three adult children, divorced in March 2012 and remain on friendly terms. In 2019, Whelchel married Pete Harris, who is a psychologist based in Nashville, Tennessee. She is stepmother to his son.

 Published works 

 Whelchel, Lisa. Creative Correction, Tyndale House Publishers, 320 pages, 2000. 
 Whelchel, Lisa. The Facts of Life (and Other Lessons My Father Taught Me), Multnomah Books, 192 pages, 2001. 
 Whelchel, Lisa. So You're Thinking About Homeschooling: Fifteen Families Show How You Can Do It (2nd edition), Multnomah Books, 224 pages, 2005. 
 Whelchel, Lisa. How to Start Your Own Mom TimeThe ADVENTure of Christmas: Helping Children Find Jesus in Our Holiday TraditionsTaking Care of the Me in MommyThe Busy Mom's Guide to PrayerThe Busy Mom's Guide to WisdomThe Busy Grandma's Guide to PrayerSpeaking Mom-ese: Moments of Peace & Inspiration in the Mother Tongue from One Mom's Heart to Yours''

Filmography

Film

Television

Music videos

Producer

Discography

Awards and nominations

See also

References

External links
 
 
 

1963 births
Actresses from Texas
American bloggers
American child actresses
American Christians
American performers of Christian music
American television actresses
American television talk show hosts
American women bloggers
20th-century American actresses
21st-century American actresses
Living people
Mouseketeers
People from Fort Worth, Texas
People from Lamb County, Texas
People from Littlefield, Texas
Singers from Texas
Survivor (American TV series) contestants
Writers from Texas